Ethiopian Canadians are a hyphenated ethnicity of Canadians who are of full or partial Ethiopian national origin, heritage and/or ancestry, Canadian citizens of Ethiopian descent, or an Ethiopia-born person who resides in Canada. According to the 2016 Canadian Census, 44,065 people reported Ethiopian ancestry.

History
Ethiopians began to immigrate to Canada in small numbers following new immigration regulations in 1962, which allowed skilled immigrants into the country regardless of ethnicity or country of origin. However, significant immigration did not occur until the mid-1980s.

Demographics
According to the 2011 Canadian Census, approximately 30,810 people reported Ethiopian ancestry. This number increased to 44,065 by 2016. In addition, a number of people reported other Ethiopian ethnicity: 1,530 people had Amhara ancestry, 660 had Harari ancestry, 3,350 had Oromo ancestry. A further 2,155 reported Tigrayan ancestry, although some of these might be Eritrean. These numbers cannot be added to people reporting Ethiopian ancestry as this may lead to double counting. Of the people reporting Ethiopian ancestry, 32,790 were Canadian residents born in Ethiopia and 7,510 were recent immigrants.

Geographic distribution
The following table lists Canadian provinces by Ethiopian population.

Toronto
The largest group of Ethiopians in Canada is that of Toronto. As of 2016, approximately 15,990 people of Ethiopian descent live in the Toronto CMA. Toronto is home to community organizations such as the Ethiopian Association Toronto, which was founded in 1980. There is a concentration of Ethiopian restaurants and businesses along Danforth Avenue East; the area is unofficially referred to as "Little Ethiopia".

Calgary
As of 2016, approximately 6,355 people of Ethiopian descent live in Calgary.

Edmonton
As of 2016, approximately 5,210 people of Ethiopian descent live in Edmonton.

Ottawa
As of 2016, approximately 2,850 people of Ethiopian descent live in Ottawa. The Dawit family, who were among the first Ethiopians to settle in Canada in the 1960s, lived in Ottawa.

Winnipeg
As of 2016, approximately 2,520 people of Ethiopian descent live in Winnipeg.

Vancouver
As of 2016, approximately 2,020 people of Ethiopian descent live in the Vancouver CMA.

Other places
Approximately 1,575 people of Ethiopian descent live in the province of Quebec, the majority (1,020) of whom live in Montreal.

Notable individuals

See also
Demographics of Ethiopia
Ethiopian Americans

References

Ethnic groups in Canada
Canada
 
 
Ethiopian emigrants to Canada
African Canadian